Newman Power Station is a power station in Newman, Western Australia, part of the Pilbara region of Western Australia. It is located about 1,186 kilometres (737 mi) north of Perth, and 9 kilometres (5.6 mi) north of the Tropic of Capricorn. It is a  natural gas-fired power station servicing BHP Billiton’s “islanded grid”. Newman currently provides 100% of the power requirement of the islanded grid which supplies electricity to the Mt Newman Joint Venture operated by BHP Billiton Iron Ore.
 
The station was commissioned in 1996 and is owned and operated by Alinta Energy. It receives its fuel from the Goldfields Gas Pipeline. In the event of interruptions to the gas supply, the power station can operate on diesel, and has approximately a million litres stored on site.

The power station has a dedicated 121km transmission line to deliver electricity to the Roy Hill Mine since 2015. It has four gas turbines. In 2017, a 35MW/11MWh battery was installed to provide increased reliability and reserve.

See also 
 Alinta Energy

References

External links 

Alinta Energy generation

Natural gas-fired power stations in Western Australia
1996 establishments in Australia